Mike or Michael Hunt may refer to:

 Mike Hunt (American football) (born 1956), American football linebacker
 Mike Hunt (baseball) (1907–1996), American baseball player
 Michael John Hunt (born 1941), English figurative painter and etcher
 Mike Hunt (gag name), used in film and other media

See also
 Michael Hunter (disambiguation)